A skeleton crew is the minimum number of personnel needed to operate and maintain an item such as a business, organization, or ship at its most simple operating requirements. Skeleton crews are often utilized during an emergency and are meant to keep an item's vital functions operating. The COVID-19 pandemic is an example of when skeleton crews are used, such as in news stations.

Uses
 Shipboard – to keep a ship operating after it has been damaged and awaiting tow to port.
 Blizzards, hurricanes, and typhoons – to remain at a business location during a major storm to monitor conditions and to make emergency repairs if possible.
 Inactivity – to keep an inactive facility, such as a commercial building in transition between owners, from being vandalized.
 Temporary closings – to monitor and maintain the facility while it is otherwise shut down for a holiday, strike, etc.
 Medical attention – to keep an inactive facility for radioactive poisoning.
 Film crew – on a very low-budget production to shoot some form of media.
 Television and radio stations – to meet license requirements. Most broadcasting authorities require a minimum of two employees, usually an engineer to handle on-air operations and transmitter maintenance, and a manager or clerk to maintain station records and correspondence. For stations on automation or which are translator stations, this allows the station to claim to meet local presence requirements in its city of license even if all programming is originating elsewhere.

References

Business terms
Nautical terminology